Stibeutes is a genus of parasitoid wasps belonging to the family Ichneumonidae.

Species 
Stibeutes contains the following species.
 Stibeutes blandi Schwarz & Shaw, 2011
 Stibeutes breviareolatus (Thomson, 1884)
 Stibeutes brevicornis (Lange, 1911)
 Stibeutes calderonae Bordera & Hernández-Rodríguez, 2004
 Stibeutes cinctellus (Fonscolombe, 1851)
 Stibeutes curvispina (Thomson, 1884)
 Stibeutes gravenhorstii Förster, 1850
 Stibeutes heinemanni Förster, 1850
 Stibeutes heterogaster (Thomson, 1885)
 Stibeutes hirsutus Bordera & Hernandez-Rodriguez, 2004
 Stibeutes infernalis (Ruthe, 1859)
 Stibeutes intermedius Horstmann, 2010
 Stibeutes nigrinus Horstmann, 2010
 Stibeutes pedestrator Aubert, 1982
 Stibeutes pilosus Horstmann, 1993
 Stibeutes rozsypali (Gregor, 1941)
 Stibeutes tricinctor (Aubert, 1968)
 Stibeutes yuasai'' (Bradley, 1918)

References

Ichneumonidae
Ichneumonidae genera
Insects described in 1869